The 1897 Northwestern Purple team represented Northwestern University during the 1897 Western Conference football season. In their first and only year under head coach Jesse Van Doozer, the Purple compiled a 5–3 record (0–2 against Western Conference opponents) and finished in sixth place in the Western Conference.

Schedule

References

Northwestern
Northwestern Wildcats football seasons
Northwestern Purple football